Sears Operadora México, S.A. de C.V. is a department store chain located in Mexico, operating 92 stores all over Mexico as of 2022. Sears México is operated by Grupo Sanborns, a division of Grupo Carso.

History

Early history 
On 26 February 1947, the first Sears in Mexico was opened in Mexico City by Sears, Roebuck and Co. to an excited public.

The location was in Colonia Roma on Avenida Insurgentes, now the site of the Plaza Insurgentes mall, where a Sears store still operates. This was far from the upscale shopping districts at that time, downtown along Avenida Juárez and the department stores just south of the Zócalo.

In the first three days of operation around 110,000 guests visited the store spending around $600,000 on goods. In its first week of operation, the store struggled to stock its shelves, requiring three airplanes to fly in more goods from a Texas warehouse owned by the parent company. Its introduction to the Mexican economy is seen by some as helping to usher in a consumer evolution in Mexico, shifting the nation's focus from nationalism and redistribution of wealth to happiness and individual self-realization.

In its first year of operation, the Mexico City store did around $16 million in business, almost twice as much as was expected by its parent company. However, just a few months after opening, in order to prevent a drain on the nation's foreign-currency reserves, Mexico barred some nonessential imports and raised tariffs on others. This impacted the Mexico City store tremendously, which was at the time importing around 90 percent of its merchandise.

This forced the store to create alliances with Mexican manufacturers, offering financial and technical aid to suppliers to meet its burgeoning demand for goods. It also bought interest in factories that were producing its merchandise. By 1949, Sears México had around 2,500 Mexican suppliers furnishing some 80 percent of the goods in the Mexico City store.

A second and third Sears were opened in 1949 in Monterrey and Guadalajara, and by 1953 Sears had seven stores in Mexico and annual sales of more than $15 million and employed around 1,900 people. These employees received unheard of benefits from the company including: overtime, merit raises, cost-of-living allowances, paid vacations, retirement funds, access to company cafeterias, free medical treatment and medicines and discounts on purchases.

By 1956 there were 17 Sears stores in Mexico with a sales volume of around $25 million. There were around 3,200 employees at that time, all but 16 of which were Mexican citizens. Additionally, about 90 percent of the merchandise sold in its stores was made in Mexico.

Grupo Carso 
On 2 April 1997, Sears formed a strategic alliance with Grupo Carso, owned by Mexican businessman Carlos Slim Helú, through which it was agreed to sell 85% of Sears México to Grupo Carso, which as of 2022 owns 100% of the company. Even though Sears unveiled a new lowercase logo in the United States in 2010, Sears México changed its logo to a red variant of the 1994-2004 Sears uppercase blue logo in 2013.

Dorian's 
 
In 2004, Grupo Carso bought Dorian's Tijuana, S.A. de C.V., a mid-range department store chain present mostly in northwestern Mexico, established in Downtown Tijuana in 1959.  Carso operated it as a subsidiary of Inmuebles Borgru, S.A. de C.V., which was in turn a subsidiary of Inmuebles Carso, S.A.B. de C.V. In that same year, Dorian's purchased 5 department store locations from JCPenney, the U.S.-based retailer which had been operating in Mexico since 1995.

In April 2009, the Dorian's brand was jettisoned and 13 of the 14 Dorian’s locations were converted to Sears: In Tijuana: 3 stores Plaza Río Tijuana, Plaza Carrousel in La Mesa, Centro Comercial Mesa de Otay); in Cancún - Plaza Las Américas (formerly JCPenney), in Chihuahua City - Plaza de Sol (formerly JCPenney); Downtown Ensenada; Downtown La Paz and Forjadores La Paz; in León, Guanajuato - Plaza Mayor (formerly JCPenney); in Mérida - Plaza las Américas (formerly JCPenney), in Mexicali - Centro Comercial Cachanilla; in the Monterrey area - San Pedro Garza García (formerly JCPenney and since moved to San Agustín); and a store in San Luis Río Colorado, Sonora (since closed). The exception was the Downtown Tijuana Dorian's flagship which was closed in May 2009 and is now the "Plaza de la Tecnología", a market hall of consumer technology vendors.

Current status 
Despite the bankruptcy of its former parent company, the closing of many stores in the United States and Canada, and subsequent sale to ESL Investments, Sears México still remains open for business due to different ownership.

In July 2021 it was announced that the Mexican company is considering renaming their stores to distance itself from its failing former parent in the United States, however, the company is currently celebrating its 75th Anniversary in Mexico.

Locations 
Sears has 93 stores across the country, including 25 in Greater Mexico City (14 in Mexico City proper, 11 in the suburbs in the State of Mexico). The remaining 67 stores are spread across the country from Tijuana to Cancún, with a presence in all 32 states except Campeche.

In Greater Mexico City, branches are located in the city proper at Portal San Ángel, Parque Via Vallejo in Azcapotzalco, Plaza Universidad, World Trade Center in Nápoles, Perisur, Centro Santa Fe, Avenida Juárez in the Historic Center, Forum Buenavista, Plaza Insurgentes (Colonia Roma (the first in Mexico, opening in 1947), Plaza Lindavista, Parque Tezontle, Parque Las Antenas in Iztapalapa, Pabellón Polanco, and Galerías Coapa in Tlalpan. In the State of Mexico portion of the metro area, Sears stores are located at Galerías Atizapan, Plaza Chimalhuacan, Zentralia Coacalco, Cosmopol in Coacalco, Mexipuerto Cuatro Caminos, Luna Parc Cuautitlan Izcalli, Plaza las Américas in Ecatepec, Paseo Interlomas, Plaza Ciudad Jardín in Ciudad Nezahualcóyotl, Plaza Satélite and Plaza Tlalne Fashion Mall in Tlalnepantla.

References

External links 
 

Retail companies established in 1947
Companies based in Mexico City
Retail companies of Mexico
Department stores of Mexico
Sears Holdings
Mexican companies established in 1947